The Bottorff–McCulloch Farm is a historic home and farm located in Charlestown Township, Clark County, Indiana.  The farmhouse was built about 1835, and is a two-story, Greek Revival style brick dwelling.  It has a gable roof and sits on a coursed stone foundation. It features a one-story portico. Also on the property are the contributing summer kitchen, two English barns, a three-portal barn, two silos, and a milk house.

It was listed on the National Register of Historic Places in 1995.

References

Charlestown, Indiana
Farms on the National Register of Historic Places in Indiana
Greek Revival houses in Indiana
Houses completed in 1835
Buildings and structures in Clark County, Indiana
National Register of Historic Places in Clark County, Indiana